Burton in Lonsdale is a village and civil parish in the Craven District of North Yorkshire, England, close to the border with Lancashire and Cumbria.  It is in Lonsdale (the River Lune valley and its tributaries). The parish is approximately 1,500 acres (6 km2) in area and has many farms – dairy, beef and sheep. Little is grown, except grass to feed the animals.

The village was historically part of the West Riding of Yorkshire until 1974.

Formerly famous for country pottery, it is now a quiet village situated between two national parks (the Lake District National Park and the Yorkshire Dales National Park) and by the side of the River Greta.

History
The settlement is mentioned in the Domesday Book as being in the Hundred of Amounderness, later being recorded in the wapentake of Ewecross. The name derives from the Old English burh-tūn, a farmstead with, or near, a fortification (the castle). It was first recorded in 1130 as being either Burtona de Lanesdala, Burton(a) in Lanesdala, or Burton(a) in Lanesdale. The village contains a motte that is the remains of Burton in Lonsdale Castle. The castle belonged to the Mowbray family, and is believed to have been abandoned sometime in the middle of the 14th century.

In his will of 1593 Henry the 4th Earl of Derby bequeathed his manor of Burton In Lonsdale to his second son the Hon William Stanley who less than two years later became the 6th Earl after the poisoning of his older brother Ferdinando the 5th Earl.

Stoneware and earthenware pottery was produced between about 1650 and 1944, in a total of thirteen potteries, using locally available clay and coal. It is said Burton was known as 'Black Burton' because of the amount of smoke produced by the kilns' fires when firing pots. The firing was carried out over several days at a time, on a regular basis. The quality of the coal (initially locally sourced) was to blame for the amount of smoke. This was eventually replaced by better coal from South and West Yorkshire when the railways arrived in the locality. Burton pottery is notoriously difficult to identify as most potteries did not mark their products. Coal and clay were readily available from the Ingleton Coalfield, which outcropped at Burton in Lonsdale.

The River Greta winds its way past the village to the south. Several woodlands are sited on the banks of the river, some of them ancient. The paths leading to the wood has pottery remnants strewn across them.

Modern village
In 2001, the census recorded 579 people living in the civil parish, which was unchanged at the 2011 Census. In 2015, North Yorkshire County Council estimated the population to be 600. The village has a community run shop (containing a small post-office) where local goods such as meats, cheeses and vegetables are available.

In August 2014 the village founded a road cycling club called Lonsdale Wheelers CC. The club meets on the first and third Sundays of every month with a 10.00 start from the village shop.

The Village Hall hosts a number of regular clubs and events, details on the Village Hall page. Events include circuit training, a monthly music night, a WI group and karate.

Also for the 2014–15 season a football club, Burton United F.C, was formed and admitted into the North Lancashire and District Football League. The club however folded at the end of the 2015–16 season. The club played their home games at Burton recreation ground.

The village school closed in 2014, after pupil numbers fell to 13. The school had been built in 1853, with money donated by Richard Thornton, a millionaire who had been born in the village. Pupils now travel to Bentham for schooling.

Notable people
Laurence Binyon (1869–1943), poet who wrote For the Fallen, lived in the village between 1870 and 1875. The view of Ingleborough influenced his poem Inheritance
James Dyson (1914–1990), physicist who lived in the village in his childhood
Geoffrey Holmes, historian, lived in Burton in Lonsdale from 1969 onwards
Richard Thornton (1776–1865), the Victorian millionaire was born in Burton in Lonsdale. He donated £10,000 to fund a school in the village.

See also
All Saints Church, Burton in Lonsdale
William Stanley, 6th Earl of Derby

References

Sources

External links

 Welcome to Burton-in-Lonsdale
Example of Burton in Lonsdale pottery at MERL

Villages in North Yorkshire
Civil parishes in North Yorkshire
Craven District